Until 2010, the county of Warwickshire was divided into 5 parliamentary constituencies - they were all county constituencies. Now it has six parliamentary constituencies - 5 county constituencies and 1 borough constituency.

Constituencies

2010 boundary changes
Under the Fifth Periodic Review of Westminster constituencies, the Boundary Commission for England decided to the number of constituencies in Warwickshire from 5 to 6 for the 2010 election, with the creation of the new constituency of Kenilworth and Southam, combining the two towns of Kenilworth, transferred from Rugby and Kenilworth (renamed Rugby), and Southam, transferred from Stratford-on-Avon. The revised, more compact, Warwick and Leamington constituency was redesignated as a Borough constituency.

Proposed boundary changes 
See 2023 Periodic Review of Westminster constituencies for further details.

Following the abandonment of the Sixth Periodic Review (the 2018 review), the Boundary Commission for England formally launched the 2023 Review on 5 January 2021. Initial proposals were published on 8 June 2021 and, following two periods of public consultation, revised proposals were published on 8 November 2022. Final proposals will be published by 1 July 2023.

The commission has proposed retaining the current six constituencies in Warwickshire, with minor boundary changes primarily to reflect changes to ward boundaries. Although its boundaries are unchanged, it is proposed that North Warwickshire is renamed Bedworth and North Warwickshire.

Results history
Primary data source: House of Commons research briefing - General election results from 1918 to 2019

2019 
The number of votes cast for each political party who fielded candidates in constituencies comprising Warwickshire in the 2019 general election were as follows:

Percentage votes 

11983 & 1987 - SDP-Liberal Alliance

* Included in Other

Seats

Maps

Historical representation by party
A cell marked → (with a different colour background to the preceding cell) indicates that the previous MP continued to sit under a new party name.

1885 to 1918

1918 to 1950

*Transferred from Staffordshire 1911

1950 to 1983

1983 to present

See also
 List of parliamentary constituencies in the West Midlands (region)

Notes

References

 
 
Warwickshire
 Warwickshire
Warwickshire-related lists